John Charles Groome may refer to:

 John Charles Groome (Maryland), Maryland Secretary of State
 John Charles Groome (Pennsylvania), commissioner of the Pennsylvania State Police